Midas Records was an American independent record label specializing in country music and contemporary Christian music. It was founded in August 2005 by Ron Clapper, Keith Follesé and Brad Allen. The label partnered with New Revolution not long after opening. In 2008, the label underwent a restructuring which resulted in Adam Gregory being promoted by Big Machine Records while maintaining affiliation with Midas.

Former artists
Angel
Steve Azar
Jessie Daniels
Emerson Drive (Valory/Midas)
Lindsey Grant
Adam Gregory (Big Machine/No Strings Attached/Midas)
Rush of Fools
Whiskey Falls
Jon Wolfe

Weather Channel compilations
The Weather Channel released The Best of Smooth Jazz and Smooth Jazz II compilations under the Midas label.

References

External links
Official site

American independent record labels
American country music record labels
Christian record labels
Record labels established in 2005
Record labels disestablished in 2008